Teltown is a townland in County Meath, Ireland, for the area between Oristown and Donaghpatrick Kells. It was named for the Irish mythological figure or goddess, Tailtiu. The Tailtin Fair was held there in medieval times as a revival of the ancient Aonach Tailteann, and was revived as the Tailteann Games for a period in the twentieth century.

While mound structures near Teltown have been asserted in legends in the Book of Invasions to be ancient man-made earthworks 2500 years old, modern archaeological reports of the area suggest they date to at least the Iron Age. Part of one of the mounds in the area called the Knockauns was partially destroyed by bulldozers for urbanization in 1997. John O'Donovan claimed that loughs near a fort in the area called the Rath Dhubh  "have the appearance of being artificial lakes and may have been used when the Olympic Games of Tailteann were celebrated by the Irish". He also mentions a tradition that the shade of Laogaire, the King of Tara, was imprisoned by Saint Patrick until Judgement Day to the east of Rath Dhubh in the Dubhloch.

Annalistic references

The Annals of Inisfallen states that "Muiredach son of Bran, king of Laigin, harried UíNéill as far as Sliab Fuait, and the Fair of Tailtiu was held."

See also
Tailteann Games

References

External links
 A page on the church at Donaghpatrick discusses the Teltown Games.
 A Druidic page asserts the religious significance of the earthworks

History of County Meath
Archaeological sites in County Meath